The 2021 New Mexico Lobos football team represented the University of New Mexico in the 2021 NCAA Division I FBS football season. The Lobos played their home games at University Stadium as members of the Mountain Division of the Mountain West Conference. They were led by second-year head coach Danny Gonzales.

Previous season
The Lobos finished the 2020 season 2–5. They were not invited to play in any post season bowl game.

Preseason

Award watch lists

Mountain West media days
The Mountain West media days were held on July 21–22, 2021, at the Cosmopolitan in Paradise, Nevada.

Media poll
The preseason poll was released on July 21, 2021. The Lobos were predicted to finish in sixth place in the MW Mountain Division.

Preseason All-Mountain West Team
The Lobos had one player selected to the preseason All–Mountain West Team; one from the defense.

Defense

Jerrick Reed II – S

Schedule
Note: With the COVID-19 pandemic still ongoing, opponents and dates are subject to change.

Rankings

Personnel

Depth chart

Game summaries

Houston Baptist

New Mexico State

at No. 7 Texas A&M

at UTEP

Air Force

at No. 25 San Diego State

Colorado State

at Wyoming

UNLV

at Fresno State

at Boise State

Utah State

References

New Mexico
New Mexico Lobos football seasons
New Mexico Lobos football